Artemonas is a village in Sifnos and head of the homonymous community, which also includes the villages Agia Marina, Troulaki and Cherronisos. It is the second largest village of the island with 800 inhabitants (after Apollonia with 869). It is named after the goddess Artemis of the Greek mythology.

References 

Populated places in Milos (regional unit)
Villages in Greece